Driving is the controlled operation and movement of a vehicle, including cars, motorcycles, trucks, buses, and bicycles. Permission to drive on public highways is granted based on a set of conditions being met and drivers are required to follow the established road and traffic laws in the location they are driving. The word driving, has etymology dating back to the 15th century and has developed as what driving has encompassed has changed from working animals in the 15th to automobiles in the 1800s. Driving skills have also developed since the 15th century with physical, mental and safety skills being required to drive. This evolution of the skills required to drive have been accompanied by the introduction of driving laws which relate to not only the driver but the driveability of a car.

Etymology 

The origin of the term driver, as recorded from the 15th century, refers to the occupation of driving working animals, especially pack horses or draft horses. The verb ' to drive ' in origin means "to force to move, to impel by physical force". It is first recorded of electric railway drivers in 1889 and of a motor-car driver in 1896. Early alternatives were motorneer, motor-man, motor-driver or motorist.  French favors "conducteur" (the English equivalent, "conductor", being used—from the 1830s—not of the driver but of the person in charge of passengers and collecting fares), while German influenced areas adopted Fahrer (used of coach-drivers in the 18th century, but shortened about 1900 from the compound Kraftwagen Fahrer), and the verbs führen, lenken, steuern—all with a meaning "steer, guide, navigate"—translating to conduire.

Introduction of the automobile

She had said she wanted to visit her mother, but also intended to generate publicity for her husband's invention, which had only been taken on short test drives before.

In 1899, F. O. Stanley and his wife, Flora, drove their Stanley Steamer automobile, sometimes called a locomobile, to the summit of Mount Washington in New Hampshire in the United States to generate publicity for their automobile. The  journey took over two hours (not counting time to add more water); the descent was accomplished by putting the engine in low gear and much braking.

Driving skills

Driving in traffic is more than just knowing how to operate the mechanisms which control the vehicle; it requires knowing how to apply the rules of the road (which ensures safe and efficient sharing with other users). An effective driver also has an intuitive understanding of the basics of vehicle handling and can drive responsibly.

Although direct operation of a bicycle and a mounted animal are commonly referred to as riding, such operators are legally considered drivers and are required to obey the rules of the road. Driving over a long distance is referred to as a road trip.

In some countries, a basic both practical and theoretical knowledge of the rules of the road is assessed with a driving test(s) and those who pass are issued with a driving license.

Physical skill

A driver must have physical skills to be able to control direction, acceleration, and deceleration. For motor vehicles, the detailed tasks include: 
 Proper hand placement and seating position
 Starting the vehicle's engine with the starting system
 Setting the transmission to the correct gear
 Depressing the pedals with one's feet to accelerate, slow and stop the vehicle and
 If the vehicle is equipped with a manual transmission, to modulate the clutch
 Steering the vehicle's direction with the steering wheel
 Applying brake pressure to slow or stop the vehicle
 Operating other important ancillary devices such as the indicators, headlights, parking brake and windshield wipers
 Speed and Skid control

Mental skill
Avoiding or successfully handling an emergency driving situation can involve the following skills:
 Observing the environment for road signs, driving conditions, and hazards
 Awareness of surroundings, especially in heavy and city traffic
 Making good and quick decisions based on factors such as road and traffic conditions
 Evasive maneuvering
 Understanding vehicle dynamics
 Left- and right-hand traffic

Distractions can compromise a driver's mental skills, as can any altered state of consciousness. One study on the subject of mobile phones and driving safety concluded that, after controlling for driving difficulty and time on task, drivers talking on a phone exhibited greater impairment than drivers who were suffering from alcohol intoxication. In the US "During daylight hours, approximately 481,000 drivers are using cell phones while driving according to the publication on the National Highway Traffic Safety Association. Another survey indicated that music could adversely affect a driver's concentration."

Seizure disorders and Alzheimer's disease are among the leading medical causes of mental impairment among drivers in the United States and Europe. Whether or not physicians should be allowed, or even required, to report such conditions to state authorities, remains highly controversial.

Safety

Safety issues in driving include:
 Driving in poor road conditions and low visibility
 Texting while driving
 Speeding
 Drug–impaired driving and driving under the influence
 Distracted driving
 Sleep-deprived driving
 Reckless driving and street racing

Age 
There is a high rate of injury and death caused by motor vehicle accidents that involve teenage drivers. There is evidence that the less teenagers drive the risk of injury drops. There is a lack of evidence as to whether educational  interventions to promote active transport and share information about the risks, cost, and stresses involved with driving are effective at reducing or delaying car driving in the teenage years.

Driveability 
Driveability of a vehicle means the smooth delivery of power, as demanded by the driver. Typical causes of driveability degradation are rough idling, misfiring, surging, hesitation, or insufficient power.

Driving laws 
Drivers are subject to the laws of the jurisdiction in which they are driving.

International conventions 
Geneva convention requires drivers to be 18 years old.

Vienna convention requires additional skills for drivers.

Local driving laws 

The rules of the road, driver licensing and vehicle registration schemes vary considerably between jurisdictions, as do laws imposing criminal responsibility for negligent driving, vehicle safety inspections and compulsory insurance. Most countries also have differing laws against driving while under the influence of alcohol or other drugs. Aggressive driving and road rage have become problems for drivers in some areas.

Some countries require annual renewal of the driver's license. This may require getting through another driving test or vision screening test to get recertified. Also, some countries use a points system for the driver's license. Both techniques (annual renewal with tests, points system) may or may not improve road safety compared to when the driver is not continuously or annually evaluated.

Ownership and insurance
Car ownership does not require a driver's license at all. As such, even with a withdrawn driver's license, former drivers are still legally allowed to possess a car and thus have access to it. In the USA, between 1993 and 1997 13.8% of all drivers involved in fatal crashes had no driver's license.

In some countries (such as the UK), the car itself needs have a certificate that proves the vehicle is safe and roadworthy. Also, it needs to have a minimum of third party insurance.

Driving training
Motorists are almost universally required to take lessons with an approved instructor and to pass a driving test before being granted a license. Almost all countries allow all adults with good vision and health to apply to take a driving test and, if successful, to drive on public roads.

In many countries, even after passing one's driving test, new motorists are initially subject to special restrictions. For example, in Australia, novice drivers are required to carry "P" ("provisional") plates;, in New Zealand it is called restricted (R) both are subject to alcohol limits and other restrictions for the first two years of driving. Many U.S. states now issue graduated drivers' licenses to novice minors. Typically, newly licensed minors may not drive or operate a motorized vehicle at night or with a passenger other than family members. The duration of the restriction varies from six months to until the driver is 18 years old. This is due to the mental aptitude of a young or inexperienced driver not being fully developed.

A few countries banned women driving in the past. In Oman, women were not allowed to drive until 1970. In Saudi Arabia, women were not issued driving licenses until 2018. Saudi women had periodically staged driving protests against these restrictions and in September 2017, the Saudi government agreed to lift the ban, which went into effect in June 2018.

References

Further reading

External links

 

 
Land transport
Vehicle operation
Youth rights